.
Frederick Augustus Hudson (born c. 1812) was a British spirit photographer who was active in the 1870s.

Investigations
Hudson established his own studio in London, and worked with the medium Georgiana Houghton. He is credited as being the first spirit photographer in Britain.

According to Joseph McCabe, Hudson's photographs were exposed as fraudulent in 1872 by a fellow spiritualist, William Henry Harrison. Hudson was also exposed by another investigator. The psychical researcher Simeon Edmunds wrote that "John Beattie, a professional photographer of note, demonstrated conclusively that his spirits were faked by a simple process of double exposure."

In 1874, Alfred Russel Wallace visited Hudson and a photograph of him with his deceased mother was produced. Wallace declared the photograph genuine, declaring "I see no escape from the conclusion that some spiritual being, acquainted with my mother's various aspects during life, produced these recognisable impressions on the plate."

Trickery
Magic historian Milbourne Christopher has written:

Hudson introduced spirit photography to Britain in 1872. He varied his methods through the years. Though frequently caught practicing deception, he was never arrested. Hudson at one time used a trick camera, made by a craftsman who sold conjuring apparatus. Harry Price described how the camera worked in his book, Confessions of a Ghost-Hunter, published in London in 1936. When the plate slide was inserted, this action brought the paper positive of the "ghost" up against the sensitive plate. When the shutter bulb was pressed, this image and the picture of the sitter were captured on the plate. Thus a single exposure on this plate carried both images.

Hudson was known to dress up as spirits or use double exposure to produce his spirit photography. Skeptical investigator Joe Nickell noted that Hudson's photographs were fraudulent. In many cases the sitter in the photographs was positioned low to the allow  space for the "spirits" already pre-positioned by Hudson.

References

1810s births
Photographers from London
English spiritual mediums
Year of death missing